Ab Murd-e Tanglar (also Romanized as Āb Mūrd-e Tanglār; also known as Āb Mowrd and Āb Mūrd) is a village in Ludab Rural District, Ludab District, Boyer-Ahmad County, Kohgiluyeh and Boyer-Ahmad Province, Iran. At the 2006 census, its population was 32, in 6 families.

References 

Populated places in Boyer-Ahmad County